Beckum (Westphalian: Biäkem) is a town in the northern part of North Rhine-Westphalia, Germany. It is about 20 km (12 miles) north-east of Hamm and 35 km (22 miles) south-east of Münster. It gives its name to the nearby Beckum Hills.

History
Several Neolithic stone cists are the earliest traces of humans in the area around the three brooks, Kollenbach, Lippbach and Siechenbach. Because of these three brooks, the town was eventually named Bekehem or later Beckum, meaning "home upon the brooks".

In 1224, Beckum was granted its town charter, and it quickly grew in wealth as merchants and craftsmen set up businesses in the town. The town quickly expanded to an area of over 22 km2 (8.5 sq miles). However wars, riots and the Black Death in the following centuries left their mark on the town.

After the Thirty Years' War, legislation removed several rights from cities and towns, and as a result many cities and towns in Münsterland became heavily economically and religiously dependent upon the Bishop of Münster. During this period of economic and spiritual poverty, the townspeople committed several notable acts of folly, commemorated by several works of art: for example townspeople hanging on each other as they fetch a pail of water out of a well.

The town's long period of economic stagnation slowly came to an end in the 19th century. From 1803 to 1806 Beckum was under Prussian rule and from 1806 to 1816 under French rule. In 1816 Beckum became the district town of Beckum district.

In the second half of the 19th century, chalk and cement industries developed quickly, and in 1827 the first cement plant opened in Beckum. Eventually the town became one of the most important and largest cement production areas in the world.

After the end of the First World War, inflation brought Beckum's economic growth to a halt. In 1933, the Nazi regime ended democracy in the Beckum town parliament - as everywhere in Germany. During the Second World War, Beckum was fortunate and Allied Bombings destroyed only small areas of the town.

In the difficult post-war era, the townspeople developed Beckum into a modern industrial town. In 1974, the North Rhine-Westphalian state government reorganized the boundaries of several districts and towns. As of 1 January 1975, the Beckum and Warendorf districts merged into one, and Warendorf remained district town of the whole area.

Geography

Beckum is situated in the southeast corner of the agriculturally orientated Münsterland. Due to Münsterland's varied landscape of fields, pastures, hedgerows and small forests, it is often compared to a park.

A range of low hills, the Beckum Hills, almost completely surrounds Beckum in the south and east. The three brooks Kollenbach, Lippbach and Siechenbach rise in these hills and flow through the town. They are so symbolic of the area that they appear on the town's coat of arms as three silver wavy lines on a red background. The brooks converge near the town centre and form the River Werse, which flows past Ahlen and Münster to the River Ems.

Although Beckum is located in Münsterland, the nearest large city is not Münster but Hamm, which is 20 km (12 miles) away. Ahlen, Beckum's neighbour 11 km (7 miles) to the west, is the largest town in Warendorf District.

Autobahn 2, which runs from Berlin to the Ruhr area, passes to the north of Beckum. The two federal highways, B61 from Bielefeld to Hamm and B475 from Warendorf to Soest, intersect near the town centre. To the north of the town, B58 connects Ahlen to the B475.

Component municipalities 
Beckum consists of four municipalities: Beckumˌ Neubeckumˌ Vellern and Roland.

Economy
The industry in Beckum is influenced by machine engineering, the cement industry and its suppliers. However, commerce and service industries have also become a strong area of Beckum's economy.

Möllers, Blumenbecker, and Beumer count as some of the largest machine engineering companies. CEMEX and Phoenix both have cement plants located in Beckum. Polysius and Christian Pfeiffer are two suppliers of cement manufacturing systems.

Notable people
Pauline Horson (1858–1918), soprano
Uri Avnery (1923–2018), later an Israeli Knesset member
Wendelin Wiedeking (born 1952), former chairman of Porsche

Twin towns – sister cities

Beckum is twinned with:
 La Celle-Saint-Cloud, France
 Grodków, Poland
 Heringsdorf, Germany

References

Towns in North Rhine-Westphalia
Members of the Hanseatic League